Dormarch or possibly Dormarth is a hound, normally used to assist hunters by tracking or chasing the animal that is being hunted, however in Welsh mythology Dormarch's master is Gwynn ap Nudd although formerly owned by Maelgwn Gwynedd, a 6th-century king of Gwynedd.

As king of the Tylwyth Teg or fairy folk, Gwynn ap Nudd was the ruler of Annwn, the Welsh equivalent of 'Heaven' and as such he is closely associated with the Wild Hunt where he is responsible for escorting newly deceased souls of British warriors from the battlefield to the afterlife.

In myth
Dormarch has a single head, two front legs, and a body that narrows rapidly from the chest and terminates in three fish-like tails. The Dormarch's natural habitat is described in Welsh as being 'ar wybir', that is 'riding on the clouds' which haunt the mountain peaks.

In literature 
The Dialogue of Gwyn ap Nudd and Gwyddno Garanhir is found in the Black Book of Carmarthen describing how Gwyn ap Nudd meets Gwyddno, king of Cantre'r Gwaelod and converses with the king, boasting of his battlefield prowess and describing his role with the Wild Hunt, gathering the souls of fallen British warriors with the help of his hounds, thereby making Dormarch a member of the Cŵn Annwn, the 'Hounds of Annwn'.

Similar Wild Hunt hounds are found in other traditions, such as the Gabriel Hounds, Ratchets, Yell Hounds (Isle of Man), Herne the Hunter's hounds, etc.

One translation from the Black Book of Carmarthen gives :

In art 
Dormarch is shown as a pictorial representation on page 97 of Evans' Black Book of Carmarthen in a Christianised form that reduces the canine attributes and instead draws from influences such as whales in Biblical legends, typically that of Jonah.

Etymology 
The meaning and exact form of the name "Dormarch" is uncertain because although written twice in this form by the scribe, the r has been erased at some stage, probably by another individual at a later stage. The form "Dormarth" has been interpreted as 'Death's door' although contradictory evidence exists and the word "mach" translates as 'a bail or surety'.

See also
Cavall
Cerberus
Wistman's Wood

References
Notes

Sources

Evans, John Gwenogvryn (1906). The Black Book of Carmarthen. Pwllheli.

External links
 Dictionary of the Psychopomp Accessed : 2014-12-31.

Welsh legendary creatures
Welsh mythology
Mythological dogs
Mythological hybrids
13th-century books
Welsh manuscripts
Medieval Welsh literature
Welsh-language literature
Welsh poetry
Carmarthen
Mythological monsters